The Wife Who Wasn't Wanted is a 1925 American silent drama film directed by James Flood and written by Bess Meredyth. It is based on the 1923 novel The Wife Who Wasn't Wanted by Gertie Wentworth-James. The film stars Irene Rich, Huntley Gordon, John Harron, Gayne Whitman, June Marlowe, and Don Alvarado. The film was released by Warner Bros. on September 12, 1925.

Plot
As described in a film magazine reviews, Bob Mannering is riding in a motor car with others when the car hits and kills a woman. He is accused of causing the death. His father, district attorney John Mannering, decides to prosecute Bob for homicide. Bob’s mother, to prevent the prosecution of her fast-living son, tries to cause her husband’s political ruin by causing a scandal. She goes to a hotel with a crook who is in the employ of Mannering’s political rival, Jerry Wallace. She is double crossed and, to escape utter disgrace, flees to a secluded hotel that becomes engulfed in a forest fire. During the progress of the fire, she meets Diane, who confesses that it was she who was driving the death car. Mrs. Mannering returns to her family and Bob is freed.

Cast

Preservation
With no prints of The Wife Who Wasn't Wanted located in any film archives, it is a lost film.

References

External links
 
 Lantern slide (archived)

1925 films
1920s English-language films
Lost American films
Silent American drama films
1925 drama films
Warner Bros. films
Films directed by James Flood
American silent feature films
American black-and-white films
1925 lost films
Lost drama films
1920s American films